Sivoki Volitilakeba was the eldest child and only daughter of Niumataiwalu, first Roko Sau and High Chief of the Lau Islands, Fiji. Oral history has it that Sivoki was exceedingly beautiful, a trait she most likely inherited from her father and for which she was eventually used for, in strengthening alliances with other noble households. She was married off at a young age into a noble house from Somosomo, another chiefly village in Cakaudrove, a realm that came under the Tui Cakau. Her husband, Komaibatiniwai, was a renowned warrior during this period and the union from this marriage produced one child, a son, Radravu. As her husband was in his twilight years the marriage ended prematurely resulting with her and her son’s return to Lakeba, at the request of her brothers, Uluilakeba I, had by now succeeded to his father’s title. Her son was raised and adopted into one of the noble households, Vatuwaqa, whilst she herself was eventually married off again to another chief from the island of Vanua Balavu.

Fijian chiefesses
People from Lakeba
Vuanirewa